9th Multi-member Constituency – Kardzhali is a constituency whose borders are the same as Kardzhali Province in Bulgaria.

Background
In the 2009 Bulgarian parliamentary election, the 9th multi-member constituency – Kardzhali - elected 5 members to the Bulgarian National Assembly: 4 of them were by proportionality vote and 1 was by first-past-the-post voting.

Members in the Bulgarian National Assembly
 By first-past-the-post voting

 Through proportionality vote

Elections
2009 election

 proportionality vote

 first-past-the-post voting

See also
2009 Bulgarian parliamentary election
Politics of Bulgaria
List of Bulgarian Constituencies

References

Electoral divisions in Bulgaria
Kardzhali Province